Amorphus orientalis  is a Gram-negative, moderately halophilic, aerobic and non-motile bacteria from the genus Amorphus which has been isolated from sediments from a salt mine in Fenggang in China.

References

External links
Type strain of Amorphus orientalis at BacDive -  the Bacterial Diversity Metadatabase	

Hyphomicrobiales
Bacteria described in 2010
Halophiles